Sports Palace Tyumen is an indoor sporting arena located in Tyumen, Russia.    It is used for various indoor events and is the home arena of the Rubin Tyumen of the Russian Major League.  The capacity of the arena is 3,500 spectators.

External links
Venue information

Indoor ice hockey venues in Russia
Indoor arenas in Russia
Buildings and structures in Tyumen
Sport in Tyumen